Drishyam 2 is a 2022 Indian Hindi-language crime thriller film directed and co-produced by Abhishek Pathak. It is a remake of the 2021 Malayalam film of the same name and a sequel to the 2015 film Drishyam. It was jointly produced by Panorama Studios, Viacom18 Studios, and T-Series Films. 	
The film stars Ajay Devgn, Akshaye Khanna, Tabu, and Shriya Saran. It also features Saurabh Shukla, Rajat Kapoor, Ishita Dutta, Mrunal Jadhav, and Kamlesh Sawant in supporting roles. The story is set seven years after the events of the last film.

Soon after the release of the original film in February 2021, the remake came into development and was finalized within the same year. All actors from the predecessor were retained, with Khanna and Shukla as new additions. Principal photography for the film commenced in February 2022 and ended in June 2022. It was primarily shot in Goa with filming also taking place in Mumbai and Hyderabad. The film's music is composed by Devi Sri Prasad.

Drishyam 2  was released theatrically worldwide on 18 November 2022 to positive reviews. Critics particularly praised the performances, writing, cinematography and editing. The film grossed  within four days internationally and entered the 100 Crore Club in India within six days of release. The film eventually grossed  worldwide and became the 25th highest-grossing Hindi film of all time.

Plot 
 
On the night of 3 October 2014, a man named David Braganza flees from authorities for murder. While hiding behind an under-construction police station, he sees Vijay emerging from it. David later tries to escape with his wife and son but ends up getting arrested.

Seven years later, Vijay, Nandini, Anju and Anu are living contentedly. Vijay is now a affluent businessman who owns a movie theatre and still operates a cable company. He aspires to make a film of his own and is in frequent contact with screenwriter Murad Ali to develop the script. Anju, on the other hand, is a PTSD patient and has recurring episodes of epilepsy, a result of her involvement in Sam's death. Jealous of the family, a number of locals have resorted to spreading rumours about Anju being in a relationship with Sam, much to Nandini's distress. Her only solace is her friendly neighbor, Jenny, who is frequently abused by her alcoholic husband, Shiv.

On Sam's death anniversary, Vijay has an encounter with Sam's father Mahesh, who vainly asks him to disclose the location of his son's remains. Meanwhile, Nandini spends more time with Jenny and inadvertently reveals that Anju murdered Sam. Unknown to her, Jenny and Shiv are married undercover cops, assigned by Inspector-general of police Tarun Ahlawat, who is a close friend and colleague of Meera.

At the same time, David is released from jail. After struggling to reconcile with his now-estranged wife, he yearns to find employment. While coming to know that Vijay's case is still progressing, he recalls the latter's presence at the then-under-construction police station and realizes that Vijay was in fact complicit within the murder. He tips Tarun, who summons Meera and Mahesh from London. After the trio bribes him, David divulges what he saw, leading to the newly-built police station being unearthed. The police eventually discover a skeleton. Vijay, having noticed this through his CCTV cameras which he had installed around the police station, seemingly gives up.

Tarun summons Vijay's for questioning. While Vijay, Nandini, Anu, and Anju manage to maintain their alibi; Meera uncovers a voice recording of Nandini's prior confession to Jenny; the police bugged the family's residence, exposing the family. Gaitonde thrashes Nandini  Anju and Anu, causing Anju to have one of her fits. Distraught, Vijay falsely confesses that he murdered Sam. With the police satisfied, the family are let go, and Vijay gets arrested and put on trial for Sam's murder, although Meera isn't satisfied and demands that Vijay's family be punished as well.

Having learnt of Vijay's arrest, Murad visits Tarun, Meera, and Mahesh. He reveals that during one of his encounters with Vijay, the latter had fabricated a script for a future crime thriller, loosely based on Sam's murder. He reveals that the script had been turned into a novel titled Drishyam, although it was published under Murad's name for copyright protection. Vijay pleads not guilty, with his lawyer claiming that the police used Drishyam's plot as a means to frame him. Furthermore, the judge reveals that the DNA tests conducted on the skeleton do not match Sam's DNA, much to everyone's shock.

Murad reveals that Vijay had created an alternate climax for his film in which the hero, knowing his initial plan might fail, would get the remains of another male of the same age and sex who had died of similar injuries to those of the villain, by befriending the gravedigger of the local cemetery. The hero would keep the skeletal remains with him for three years before befriending the security guard of the district medical college morgue under the pretext of promising him a role in his film. The same night the remains which were excavated from the police station arrive at the morgue, the hero would swap the bodies before the DNA examination takes place.

Vijay is released on bail due to a lack of evidence, and the police are prohibited from investigating the family. The judge calls Tarun to his chambers and tells him to end all investigations against Vijay and his family, as he believes both families deserve justice, but the legal system is unable to provide it to them. The judge also tells him that such cases are not new to the system. Outside the courthouse, Murad discloses to Meera and Mahesh that Vijay's alternative climax had a twist in which the hero would hand over the villain's cremated remains to the bereaved parents. At the same time, Vijay has Sam's cremated remains anonymously handed over to Meera and Mahesh.

Mahesh immerses Sam's remains and persuades Meera to let go of her animosity towards Vijay, as he accepts they have found closure and believes Vijay would do anything to protect his family. Vijay, who was watching from afar, solemnly leaves.

Cast

Production
The sequel to Drishyam was announced after the success of  Drishyam 2 (2021), the sequel to the original 2013 Malayalam film Drishyam (2013), which released in February 2021. It was decided that Abhishek Pathak will direct the film. The film is produced by Panorama Studios and distributed by Yash Raj Films.

Principal photography of the remake sequel commenced on 17 February 2022 in Mumbai and was extensively shot in Goa with Ajay Devgn and Shriya Saran. Tabu joined the sets on 26 April, and later on, Akshaye Khanna joined on 30 April. The film was wrapped up on 21 June 2022 in Hyderabad.

Music 

The film's music is composed by Devi Sri Prasad and lyrics are written by Amitabh Bhattacharya. The first single, "Saath Hum Rahein," was released on 1 November 2022.

Reception

Critical response 
Drishyam 2 received positive reviews from critics and audience.
 Bollywood Hungama rated the film 4 out of 5 stars and termed the film a "paisavasool experience" and also praised the performances and climax. Archika Khurana of The Times of India rated the film 3.5 out of 5 stars and wrote: "Drishyam 2 dishes out plenty of twists and turns to keep you hooked throughout, just like its predecessor. And the story of the Salgaokars will continue to remain in public memory". Anna M. M. Vetticad of Firstpost rated the film 3.25 out of 5 stars. Offering a detailed comparison between the original Malayalam Drishyam 2 starring Mohanlal and this Hindi remake, she wrote: "This is an adaptation that, while faithfully reproducing Jeethu Joseph’s story, gives us a flavour of the cultural setting to which it has been transplanted from Kerala and does things with the new location that mark a refreshing change from the resurgence of prejudice and community stereotyping witnessed in Bollywood in the last decade." Rohit Bhatnagar of The Free Press Journal rated the film 3.5 out of 5 stars and wrote: "Drishyam 2 ticks almost every box on the checklist of a Bollywood film lover and makes it a great watch for massy cinephiles". Devesh Sharma of Filmfare rated the film 3.5 out of 5 stars and wrote: "Everything hinges on the performances and the entire cast has chipped in with their best efforts. Tabu looks the very picture of grief and angst. Akshaye Khanna is the new player in the field and his quirks and punch dialogue make you smile. The film rests squarely on Ajay Devgn’s able shoulders". Shalini Langer of The Indian Express rated the film 3 out of 5 stars and wrote: "The Ajay Devgn-Akshaye Khanna-Tabu starrer very deftly picks up from where the two main protagonists, both fierce parents, left off in Drishyam. Its execution is not as smooth as the last time though". Sonil Dedhia of News 18 rated the film 3 out of 5 stars and wrote: "Drishyam 2 doesn’t feel nearly as tense or urgent as it ought to, and its plot simply isn’t as deliciously complex as it could’ve been. As a result, it’s a watchable film, but not an unforgettable one". Anindita Mukherjee of India Today rated the film 2.5 out of 5 stars and wrote: "Ajay Devgn's Drishyam 2 has plenty of nail-biting moments but it will somewhere leave you missing 2015 film, Drishyam".

Box office 
Drishyam 2 earned  crore at the domestic box office on its opening day. On the second day the film collected  crore, while on the third day it collected  crore taking the domestic weekend collection to  crore. Drishyam 2 had a superb hold on Monday with collections dropping just 20% from the Friday and the Friday itself was a very good 15.38 crore nett. The Monday collections of the film are in the 11.75 crore nett range which is simply outstanding and in four days since release the film has collected almost 75 crore nett. Drishyam 2 continues with fantastic collections on Tuesday as it collected 10.50 crore nett. The five day business of the film has reached 85 crore nett.

 the film earned  net in India.

Accolades

Future 
In November 2022, Jeethu Joseph confirmed that Drishyam 3 will happen. He said "we already have the climax of Drishyam 3, we just have to think of a story that leads to the climax".

Notes

References

External links 
 
 

2020s Hindi-language films
2022 crime thriller films
2022 drama films
2022 films
2022 crime drama films
Films shot in Hyderabad, India
Films set in Goa
Films shot in Goa
Hindi remakes of Malayalam films
Indian crime thriller films
Indian thriller drama films
Indian sequel films
Films about families
Viacom18 Studios films
Works about unsolved crimes
Films scored by Devi Sri Prasad